The River Ainse (or Eyn) is a small river in the county of Norfolk. It is a tributary of the River Wensum which it merges with at Lenwade. The River Ainse has several tributaries also.

Eade's watermill
The watermill located on the river at Great Witchingham is known as Eade's Mill. The mill was built in 1666. Until 1948 the waterwheel was still in working order. By 1972 the watermill was still being used as a hammer mill to grind up pig meal and was powered by electricity. Today, the watermill and its surrounding buildings are listed.

References

See also
List of rivers of England

Ainse(Eyn)